Clubul Sportiv Municipal Reșița, commonly known as CSM Reșița, or simply as Reșița, is a men's handball club from Reșița, Romania, that plays in the Divizia A. The club was founded in 2014 as HC Adrian Petrea Reșița, to continue the handball tradition from town, after the dissolution of a much greater club UCM Reșița. After a few seasons in the Liga Națională, the club encountered financial difficulties and retired in the middle of the 2016–17 season.

In the summer of 2017 HC Adrian Petrea Reșița was refounded and re-organized as CSM Școlar Reșița, being the handball section of CSM Școlar Reșița.

Kits

Honours
Divizia A:
Winners  (1): 2015
Runners-up (1): 2019

References

External links
  

Romanian handball clubs
Sport in Reșița
Handball clubs established in 2014
2014 establishments in Romania
Liga Națională (men's handball)
Divizia A (men's handball)